Nijiya Market (ニジヤマーケット Nijiya Māketto) is a Japanese supermarket chain headquartered in Torrance, California, with store locations in California and Hawaii.  The store's rainbow logo is intended to represent a bridge between Japan and the United States.

History and overview
Founded in 1986 by Japanese immigrant Saburomaru Tsujino, Nijiya Market opened its first store in San Diego, California. Since its inception, it has offered a large variety of Japanese food products. In addition, Nijiya sells organic vegetables grown on its own 100-acre organic farm in Rainbow, California, created an internship program, and established its own brand under which rice, dashi, miso and other Japanese food products are made.

Currently, Nijiya Market operates 12 stores in California and Hawaii. Among its locations are sites in San Francisco's Japantown, San Jose's Japantown, and Los Angeles' Little Tokyo. A Nijiya store that had operated in Hartsdale, New York closed in 2018.

Gochiso Magazine
Nijiya Market publishes Gochiso Magazine (ごちそうマガジン), quarterly in Japanese and annually in English, which introduces Nijiya's products along with traditional Japanese recipes and articles covering the history of Japanese food culture. It is through Gochiso and its business operations that Nijiya participates in the practice of shokuiku.

Gallery

See also
 Mitsuwa Marketplace
 99 Ranch Market
 H Mart
 Marukai Corporation U.S.A.

References

External links

Nijiya Market home page
Nijiya's Gochiso Magazine

Japanese supermarkets
Supermarkets of the United States
American companies established in 1986
Retail companies established in 1986
1986 establishments in California
Japanese-American culture in California